The 2018 WNBA season of the Minnesota Lynx was their 20th season in the Women's National Basketball Association (WNBA). The Lynx finished the 2017 season with a record of 27–7, finishing first in the Western Conference (and the league as a whole) and qualifying for the playoffs, before ultimately beating Los Angeles in the WNBA Finals to win their league-tying best fourth championship.

The Lynx returned to the home arena, Target Center, for the 2018 season, following a year playing at the Xcel Energy Center and Williams Arena due to renovations.

The season started out shakily for the Lynx, going 2–3 in May.  The Lynx lost their season opener in a re-match of last years finals to Los Angeles.  They also lost on the road to the eventual #2 and #3 playoff seeds, Atlanta and Washington.  However, the Lynx turned it around in June, posting a 7–3 record.  This included a 6-game winning streak, which included wins over 4 eventual playoff teams.  Momentum slowed in July, with the Lynx going 6–4.  Three of their four losses in July came versus teams that ended up missing the playoffs.  The Lynx finished the season on a cold note, going 3–6 in August.  A two-game winning streak separated two three game losing streaks.  However, the team won their last game of the season to secure the 7th seed in the playoffs.

The Lynx first-round playoff matchup saw them play in Los Angeles versus the Los Angeles Sparks.  This match-up was a re-match of the past 3 WNBA Finals.  The Lynx lost the game 68–75.

Transactions

WNBA Draft

WNBA Draft Trades
The Lynx traded the drafts rights to Park Si-Ju and Kahlia Lawrence to the Las Vegas Aces in exchange for the draft rights to Jill Barta and the rights to the Aces's 2nd Round Pick in the 2019 Draft.

Trades and Roster Changes

Additions

Subtractions

Roster

Schedule

Preseason

|- style="background:#fcc;"
		 | 1
		 | May 6
		 | vs. Washington
		 | L 85–90
		 | Danielle Robinson (18)
		 | Lynetta Kizer (6)
		 | Tanisha Wright (4)
		 | Wells Fargo Arena4,203
		 | 0–1
|- style="background:#cfc;"
		 | 2
		 | May 12
		 | Chicago
		 | W 87–58
		 | Sylvia Fowles (17)
		 | Sylvia Fowles (9)
		 | Maya MooreDanielle Robinson (5)
		 | Target Center5,024
		 | 1–1

Regular season

|- style="background:#fcc;"
		 | 1
		 | May 20
		 | Los Angeles
		 | 
		 | Lindsay Whalen (17)
		 | Sylvia Fowles (12)
		 | Lindsay Whalen (9)
		 | Target Center13,032
		 | 0–1
|- style="background:#cfc;"
		 | 2
		 | May 23
		 | Dallas
		 | 
		 | Sylvia Fowles (23)
		 | Sylvia Fowles (20)
		 | Lindsay Whalen (8)
		 | Target Center7,834
		 | 1–1
|- style="background:#cfc;"
		 | 3
		 | May 25
		 | @ New York
		 | 
		 | Seimone Augustus (21)
		 | Sylvia Fowles (11)
		 | Danielle Robinson (5)
		 | Westchester County Center2,315
		 | 2–1
|- style="background:#fcc;"
		 | 4
		 | May 27
		 | @ Washington
		 | 
		 | Maya Moore (18)
		 | Sylvia Fowles (8)
		 | Tied (4)
		 | Capital One Arena5,723
		 | 2–2
|- style="background:#fcc;"
		 | 5
		 | May 29
		 | @ Atlanta
		 | 
		 | Maya Moore (18)
		 | Sylvia Fowles (13)
		 | Danielle Robinson (6)
		 | McCamish Pavilion3,785
		 | 2–3

|- style="background:#fcc;"
		 | 6
		 | June 1
		 | Phoenix
		 | 
		 | Maya Moore (25)
		 | Sylvia Fowles (11)
		 | Tanisha Wright (4)
		 | Target Center8,830
		 | 2–4
|- style="background:#fcc;"
		 | 7
		 | June 3
		 | @ Los Angeles
		 | 
		 | Maya Moore (18)
		 | Sylvia Fowles (8)
		 | Sylvia Fowles (5)
		 | Staples Center13,500
		 | 2–5
|- style="background:#cfc;"
		 | 8
		 | June 7
		 | @ Washington
		 | 
		 | Sylvia Fowles (21)
		 | Sylvia Fowles (12)
		 | Danielle Robinson (5)
		 | Capital One Arena8,587
		 | 3–5
|- style="background:#fcc;"
		 | 9
		 | June 9
		 | @ Connecticut
		 | 
		 | Sylvia Fowles (20)
		 | Sylvia Fowles (14)
		 | Alexis Jones (4)
		 | Mohegan Sun Arena6,771
		 | 3–6
|- style="background:#cfc;"
		 | 10
		 | June 16
		 | New York
		 | 
		 | Sylvia Fowles (25)
		 | Sylvia Fowles (9)
		 | Danielle Robinson (8)
		 | Target Center9,114
		 | 4–6
|- style="background:#cfc;"
		 | 11
                 | June 19
		 | Dallas
		 | 
		 | Maya Moore (21)
		 | Sylvia Fowles (17)
		 | Maya Moore (7)
		 | Target Center8,023
		 | 5–6
|-style="background:#cfc;"
		 | 12
		 | June 22
		 | @ Phoenix
		 | 
		 | Maya Moore (23)
		 | Rebekkah Brunson (11)
		 | Maya Moore (5)
		 | Talking Stick Resort Arena11,349
		 | 6–6
|-style="background:#cfc;"
		 | 13
		 | June 24
		 | @ Las Vegas
		 | 
		 | Maya Moore (23)
		 | Sylvia Fowles (10)
		 | Lindsay Whalen (9)
		 | Mandalay Bay Arena4,814
		 | 7–6
|- style="background:#cfc;"
		 | 14
		 | June 26
		 | Seattle
		 | 
		 | Maya Moore (32)
		 | Sylvia Fowles (17)
		 | Rebekkah Brunson (6)
		 | Target Center8,634
		 | 8–6
|- style="background:#cfc;"
		 | 15
		 | June 29
		 | Atlanta
		 | 
		 | Maya Moore (24)
		 | Sylvia Fowles (15)
		 | Lindsay Whalen (7)
		 | Target Center9,209
		 | 9–6

|- style="background:#cfc;"
		 | 16
		 | July 1
		 | @ Dallas
		 | 
		 | Maya Moore (26)
		 | Sylvia Fowles (9)
		 | Lindsay Whalen (6)
		 | College Park Center4,448
		 | 10–6
|- style="background:#fcc;"
		 | 17
		 | July 3
		 | Indiana
		 | 
		 | Rebekkah Brunson (13)
		 | Rebekkah Brunson (12)
		 | Rebekkah Brunson (6)
		 | Target Center8,632
		 | 10–7
|-style="background:#cfc;"
		 | 18
		 | July 5
		 | Los Angeles
		 | 
		 | Sylvia Fowles (27)
		 | Rebekkah Brunson (12)
		 | Sylvia Fowles (7)
		 | Target Center9,303
		 | 11–7
|- style="background:#fcc;"
		 | 19
		 | July 7
		 | @ Chicago
		 | 
		 | Maya Moore (16)
		 | Sylvia Fowles (13)
		 | Danielle Robinson (5)
		 | Wintrust Arena6,139
		 | 11–8
|- style="background:#cfc;"
		 | 20
		 | July 11
		 | @ Indiana
		 | 
		 | Sylvia Fowles (20)
		 | Sylvia Fowles (10)
		 | Sylvia Fowles (7)
		 | Bankers Life Fieldhouse10,006
		 | 12–8
|- style="background:#fcc;"
		 | 21
                 | July 13
		 | Las Vegas
		 | 
		 | Lindsay Whalen (22)
		 | Sylvia Fowles (17)
		 | Tied (5)
		 | Target Center9,813
		 | 12–9
|- style="background:#fcc;"
		 | 22
		 | July 15
		 | Connecticut
		 | 
		 | Sylvia Fowles (12)
		 | Sylvia Fowles (8)
		 | Temi Fagbenle (4)
		 | Target Center9,234
		 | 12–10
|- style="background:#cfc;"
		 | 23
		 | July 18
		 | Indiana
		 | 
		 | Sylvia Fowles (30)
		 | Sylvia Fowles (16)
		 | Erlana Larkins (8)
		 | Target Center17,933
		 | 13–10
|- style="background:#cfc;"
		 | 24
		 | July 21
		 | @ Phoenix
		 | 
		 | Maya Moore (38)
		 | Rebekkah Brunson (11)
		 | Danielle Robinson (3)
		 | Talking Stick Resort Arena11,473
		 | 14–10
|- style="background:#cfc;"
		 | 25
		 | July 24
		 | New York
		 | 
		 | Sylvia Fowles (27)
		 | Sylvia Fowles (11)
		 | Seimone Augustus (5)
		 | Target Center9,830
		 | 15–10

|- style="background:#fcc;"
		 | 26
		 | August 2
		 | @ Los Angeles
		 | 
		 | Sylvia Fowles (14)
		 | Sylvia Fowles (8)
		 | Danielle Robinson (6)
		 | Staples Center9,542
		 | 15–11
|- style="background:#fcc;"
		 | 27
		 | August 3
		 | @ Seattle
		 | 
		 | Sylvia Fowles (20)
		 | Sylvia Fowles (16)
		 | Rebekkah Brunson (5)
		 | KeyArena12,064
		 | 15–12
|- style="background:#fcc;"
		 | 28
		 | August 5
		 | Atlanta
		 | 
		 | Sylvia Fowles (17)
		 | Sylvia Fowles (10)
		 | Maya Moore (4)
		 | Target Center9.333
		 | 15–13
|- style="background:#cfc;"
		 | 29
		 | August 7
		 | @ Chicago
		 | 
		 | Maya Moore (31)
		 | Sylvia Fowles (11)
		 | Danielle Robinson (11)
		 | Wintrust Arena6,388
		 | 16–13
|- style="background:#cfc;"
		 | 30
		 | August 9
		 | @ Las Vegas
		 | 
		 | Maya Moore (34)
		 | Sylvia Fowles (19)
		 | Tanisha Wright (6)
		 | Mandalay Bay Arena4,497
		 | 17–13
|- style="background:#fcc;"
		 | 31
                 | August 12
		 | Seattle
		 | 
		 | Sylvia Fowles (28)
		 | Sylvia Fowles (13)
		 | Seimone Augustus (6)
		 | Target Center9,123
		 | 17–14
|- style="background:#fcc;"
		 | 32
		 | August 14
		 | Chicago
		 | 
		 | Maya Moore (21)
		 | Sylvia Fowles (13)
		 | Tanisha Wright (6)
		 | Target Center9,730
		 | 17–15
|- style="background:#fcc;"
		 | 33
		 | August 17
		 | @ Connecticut
		 | 
		 | Sylvia Fowles (25)
		 | Sylvia Fowles (8)
		 | Maya Moore (8)
		 | Mohegan Sun Arena7,089
		 | 17–16
|- style="background:#cfc;"
		 | 34
		 | August 19
		 | Washington
		 | 
		 | Sylvia Fowles (26)
		 | Sylvia Fowles (14)
		 | Lindsay Whalen (6)
		 | Target Center13,013
		 | 18–16

Playoffs

|- style="background:#fcc;"
		 | 1
		 | August 21
		 | @ Los Angeles
		 | 
		 | Sylvia Fowles (18)
		 | Sylvia Fowles (12)
		 | Lindsay Whalen (5)
		 | Staples Center8,598
		 | 0–1

Standings

Playoffs

Statistics

Regular season

Awards and Milestones

Top 20 Players
With the Lynx entering their 20th season in the league, the organization began ranking their Top 20 Players of All-Time.

 1. Maya Moore
 2. Seimone Augustus
 3. Lindsay Whalen
 4. Sylvia Fowles
 5. Rebekkah Brunson
 6. Katie Smith
 7. Svetlana Abrosimova
 8. Tamika Williams
 9. Teresa Edwards
 10. Taj McWilliams-Franklin
 11. Betty Lennox
 12. Janel McCarville
 13. Renee Montgomery
 14. Nicole Ohlde
 15. Monica Wright
 16. Tonya Edwards
 17. Kristen Mann
 18. Charde Houston
 19. Nicky Anosike
 20. Devereaux Peters

References

Minnesota Lynx seasons